Hole-in-the-Wall Provincial Park is a provincial park located in the Hart Ranges of British Columbia, Canada. It was established on June 29, 2000 to protect a resurgent spring which emerges from the base of a limestone rock wall. The spring forms a powerful stream that flows into the Sukunka River at the northern end of the park.

See also
Sukunka Falls Provincial Park

References

External links

Peace River Regional District
Provincial parks of British Columbia
2000 establishments in British Columbia
Protected areas established in 2000